Xerocrassa carinatoglobosa is a species of air-breathing land snail, a terrestrial pulmonate gastropod mollusk in the family Geomitridae.

Geographic distribution

X. carinatoglobosa is endemic to Cyprus, where it is known from three locations in the southern part of the island.

References

 Bank, R. A.; Neubert, E. (2017). Checklist of the land and freshwater Gastropoda of Europe. Last update: July 16th, 2017

carinatoglobosa
Invertebrates of Cyprus
Endemic fauna of Cyprus
Gastropods described in 1934
Taxobox binomials not recognized by IUCN